This article is about the history of competitors at the Olympic Games using banned athletic performance-enhancing drugs.

History 
The use of performance-enhancing tactics or more formally known as PEDs, and more broadly, the use of any external device to nefariously influence the outcome of a sporting event has been a part of the Olympics since its inception in Ancient Greece.  One speculation as to why men were required to compete naked was to prevent the use of extra accoutrements and to keep women from competing in events specifically designed for men. Athletes were also known to drink "magic" potions and eat exotic meats in the hopes of giving them an athletic edge on their competition.  If they were caught cheating, their likenesses were often engraved into stone and placed in a pathway that led to the Olympic stadium. In the modern Olympic era, chemically enhancing one's performance has evolved into a sophisticated science, but in the early years of the Modern Olympic movement the use of performance-enhancing drugs was almost as crude as its ancient predecessors. For example, the winner of the marathon at the 1904 Games, Thomas Hicks, was given strychnine and brandy by his coach, even during the race.

During the early 20th century, many Olympic athletes discovered ways to improve their athletic abilities by boosting testosterone. As their methods became more extreme, it became increasingly evident that the use of performance-enhancing drugs was not only a threat to the integrity of sport but could also have potentially fatal side effects on the athlete. The only Olympic death linked to athletic drug use occurred at the Rome Games of 1960. During the cycling road race, Danish cyclist Knud Enemark Jensen fell from his bicycle and later died. A coroner's inquiry found that he was under the influence of amphetamine, which had caused him to lose consciousness during the race.  Jensen's death exposed to the world how endemic drug use was among elite athletes.  By the mid-1960s, sports federations were starting to ban the use of performance-enhancing drugs, and the IOC followed suit in 1967.

The first Olympic athlete to test positive for the use of performance-enhancing drugs was Hans-Gunnar Liljenwall, a Swedish pentathlete at the 1968 Summer Olympics, who lost his bronze medal for alcohol use, "two beers" to steady his nerves. Liljenwall was the only athlete to test positive for a banned substance at the 1968 Olympics, as the technology and testing techniques improved, the number of athletes discovered to be chemically enhancing their performance increased as well. 

The most systematic case of drug use for athletic achievement is that of the East German Olympic teams of the 1970s and 1980s.  In 1990, documents were discovered that showed many East German female athletes, especially swimmers, had been administered anabolic steroids and other drugs by their coaches and trainers. Girls as young as eleven were started on the drug regimen without consent from their parents. American female swimmers, including Shirley Babashoff, accused the East Germans of using performance-enhancing drugs as early as the 1976 Summer Games.  Babashoff's comments were dismissed by the international and domestic media as sour grapes since Babashoff, a clear favorite to win multiple gold medals, won three silver medals – losing all three times to either of the two East Germans Kornelia Ender or Petra Thümer, and one gold medal in a relay.  There was no suspicion of cheating on the part of the East German female swimmers even though their medal tally increased from four silvers and one bronze in 1972 to ten golds (out of a possible 12), six silvers, and one bronze in 1976.  No clear evidence was discovered until after the fall of the Berlin Wall, when the aforementioned documents proved that East Germany had embarked on a state-sponsored drug regimen to dramatically improve their competitiveness at the Olympic Games and other international sporting events. Many of the East German authorities responsible for this program have been subsequently tried and found guilty of various crimes in the German penal system.

The report, titled "Doping in Germany from 1950 to today", details how the West German government helped fund a wide-scale doping program. West Germany encouraged and covered up a culture of doping across many sports for decades. Doping of West German athletes was prevalent at the Munich Games of 1972, and at the 1976 Montreal Olympics.

According to British journalist Andrew Jennings, a KGB colonel stated that the agency's officers had posed as anti-doping authorities from the International Olympic Committee to undermine doping tests and that Soviet athletes were "rescued with [these] tremendous efforts". On the topic of the 1980 Summer Olympics, a 1989 Australian study said "There is hardly a medal winner at the Moscow Games, certainly not a gold medal winner, who is not on one sort of drug or another: usually several kinds. The Moscow Games might as well have been called the Chemists' Games."

Documents obtained in 2016 revealed the Soviet Union's plans for a statewide doping system in track and field in preparation for the 1984 Summer Olympics in Los Angeles. Dated prior to the country's decision to boycott the Games, the document detailed the existing steroids operations of the program, along with suggestions for further enhancements. The communication, directed to the Soviet Union's head of track and field, was prepared by Dr. Sergei Portugalov of the Institute for Physical Culture. Portugalov was also one of the main figures involved in the implementation of the Russian doping program prior to the 2016 Summer Olympics.

China conducted a state sanctioned doping programme on athletes in the 1980s and 1990s. In a July 2012 interview published by the Sydney Morning Herald newspaper, Chen Zhangho, the lead doctor for the Chinese Olympic team at the Los Angeles, Seoul and Barcelona Olympics told of how he had tested hormones, blood doping and steroids on about fifty elite athletes. Chen also accused the United States, the Soviet Union and France of using performance-enhancing drugs at the same time as China.

A very publicized steroid-related disqualification at an Olympic Games was the case of Canadian sprinter Ben Johnson, who won the Men's 100 metres at the 1988 Seoul Olympics, but tested positive for stanozolol. His gold medal was subsequently stripped and awarded to runner-up Carl Lewis, who had tested positive for stimulants at the U.S. Olympic Trials. The highest level of stimulant Lewis recorded was 6 ppm, which was regarded as a positive test in 1988 but is now regarded as a negative test. The acceptable level was later raised to ten parts per million for ephedrine and twenty-five parts per million for other substances. According to the IOC rules at the time, positive tests with levels lower than 10 ppm were cause of further investigation but not immediate ban. Neal Benowitz, a professor of medicine at UC San Francisco who is an expert on ephedrine and other stimulants, agreed that "These [levels] are what you'd see from someone taking cold or allergy medicines and are unlikely to have any effect on performance." The IAAF acknowledged that at the 1988 Olympic Trials the USOC followed the correct procedures in dealing with positive findings for ephedrine and ephedrine-related compounds in low concentration.

Response
In the late 1990s, the IOC took the initiative in a more organized battle against doping, leading to the formation of the World Anti-Doping Agency (WADA) in 1999. The 2000 Summer Olympics and 2002 Winter Olympics have shown that the effort to eliminate performance-enhancing drugs from the Olympics is not over, as several medalists in weightlifting and cross-country skiing were disqualified due to failing a drug test. During the 2006 Winter Olympics, only one athlete failed a drug test and had a medal revoked. The IOC-established drug testing regimen (now known as the "Olympic Standard") has set the worldwide benchmark that other sporting federations attempt to emulate. During the Beijing games, 3,667 athletes were tested by the IOC under the auspices of the World Anti-Doping Agency. Both urine and blood testing was used in a coordinated effort to detect banned substances and recent blood transfusions.  While several athletes were barred from competition by their National Olympic Committees prior to the Games, six athletes failed drug tests while in competition in Beijing.

Prohibited drugs

Summer Olympic Games
What follows is a list of all the athletes that have tested positive for a banned substance either during or after an Olympic Games in which they competed.  Any medals listed were revoked by the International Olympic Commission (IOC). In 1967 the IOC banned the use of performance-enhancing drugs, instituted a Medical Commission, and created a list of banned substances. Mandatory testing began at the following year's Games. In a few cases the IOC has reversed earlier rulings that stripped athletes of medals.

1968 Mexico City

1972 Munich

As a 16-year-old, Rick DeMont qualified to represent the United States at the 1972 Summer Olympics in Munich, Germany.  He originally won the gold medal in the men's 400-meter freestyle, but following the race, the International Olympic Committee (IOC) disqualified DeMont  after his post-race urinalysis tested positive for traces of the banned substance ephedrine contained in his prescription asthma medication, Marax. The positive test following the 400-meter freestyle final also deprived him of a chance at multiple medals, as he was barred from any other events at the Olympics, including the 1,500-meter freestyle for which he was the then-current world record-holder.

Before the Olympics, DeMont had properly declared his asthma medications on his medical disclosure forms, but the U.S. Olympic Committee (USOC) had not cleared them with the IOC's medical committee. The United States Olympic Committee (USOC) has recognized his gold medal performance in the 1972 Summer Olympics in 2001, but only the IOC has the power to restore his medal, and it has, as of 2019, refused to do so.

1976 Montreal

Leibel was disqualified from the race that took place on the day that he provided the positive sample but was allowed to continue in the event.

1980 Moscow

Though no athletes were caught doping at the 1980 Summer Olympics, it has been revealed that athletes had begun using testosterone and other drugs for which tests had not been yet developed. According to British journalist Andrew Jennings, a KGB colonel stated that the agency's officers had posed as anti-doping authorities from the International Olympic Committee (IOC) to undermine doping tests and that Soviet athletes were "rescued with [these] tremendous efforts". A 1989 report by a committee of the Australian Senate claimed that "there is hardly a medal winner at the Moscow Games, certainly not a gold medal winner ... who is not on one sort of drug or another: usually several kinds. The Moscow Games might well have been called the Chemists' Games".

A member of the IOC Medical Commission, Manfred Donike, privately ran additional tests with a new technique for identifying abnormal levels of testosterone by measuring its ratio to epitestosterone in urine. Twenty percent of the specimens he tested, including those from sixteen gold medalists would have resulted in disciplinary proceedings had the tests been official. The results of Donike's unofficial tests later convinced the IOC to add his new technique to their testing protocols. The first documented case of "blood doping" occurred at the 1980 Summer Olympics as a runner was transfused with two pints of blood before winning medals in the 5000 m and 10,000 m.

1984 Los Angeles

The organizers of the Los Angeles games had refused to provide the IOC doping authorities with a safe prior to the start of the games. Due to a lack of security, medical records were subsequently stolen. A 1994 letter from IOC Medical Commission chair Alexandre de Mérode claimed that Tony Daly, a member of the Los Angeles organizing committee had destroyed the records. Dick Pound later wrote of his frustration that the organizing committee had removed evidence before it could be acted on by the IOC. Pound also claimed that IOC President Juan Antonio Samaranch and Primo Nebiolo, President of the International Association of Athletics Federations (IAAF) had conspired to delay the announcement of positive tests so that the games could pass without controversy.

The American cyclist Pat McDonough later admitted to "blood doping" at the 1984 Los Angeles Games. Following the games it was revealed that one-third of the U.S. cycling team had received blood transfusions before the games, where they won nine medals, their first medal success since the 1912 Summer Olympics. "Blood doping" was banned by the IOC in 1985 (at the time of the Olympics it was not banned), though no test existed for it at the time.

1988 Seoul

1992 Barcelona

1996 Atlanta

Five athletes tested positive for the stimulant bromantan and were disqualified by the IOC, but later reinstated after an appeal to the Court of Arbitration for Sport: swimmers Andrey Korneyev and Nina Zhivanevskaya, Greco-Roman wrestler Zafar Guliev and sprinter Marina Trandenkova, all from Russia, and the Lithuanian track cyclist Rita Razmaitė. Dr. Vitaly Slionssarenko, physician to the Lithuanian cycling team and team coach Boris Vasilyev were expelled from the games by the IOC for their role in the scandal. The athletes and officials were reprimanded.

The Irish long-distance runner Marie McMahon (Davenport) got a reprimand after testing positive for the stimulant phenylpropanolamine, and Cuban judoka Estella Rodriguez Villanueva got a reprimand after she tested positive for the diuretic furosemide.

2000 Sydney

2004 Athens

2008 Beijing

"Zero Tolerance for Doping" was adopted as an official slogan for the Beijing Olympic Games. A number of athletes were already eliminated by testing prior to coming to Beijing.

Out of the 4,500 samples that were collected from participating athletes at the games, six athletes with positive specimens were ousted from the competition. Further positive tests were found in 2016, as samples had been sealed and stored for eight years. The quality of the original testing was questioned when the BBC reported that samples positive for EPO were labeled as negative by Chinese laboratories in July 2008. The initial rate of positive findings was lower than at Athens in 2004, but the prevalence of doping had not necessarily decreased; the technology for creating and concealing drugs had become more sophisticated, and a number of drugs could not be detected.

In August 2015, the Turkish Athletics Federation confirmed that an in-competition test of Elvan Abeylegesse at the 2007 IAAF World Championships
in Athletics had been retested and found to be positive for a controlled substance, and that she had been temporarily suspended. On 29 March 2017, the IAAF confirmed the positive test, announced retroactive disqualifications and voided all of her results from 25 August 2007 until 25 August 2009, including the 2008 Summer Olympics. As a result, she was stripped of two silver medals she had won in the women's 5,000 and 10,000 meter races.

In May 2016, following the Russian doping scandal, the IOC announced that 32 targeted retests had come back positive for performance-enhancing drugs, of which Russian News Agency TASS announced that 14 were from Russian athletes, 11 of them track and field athletes, including 2012 Olympic champion high jumper Anna Chicherova. Authorities have sent the B-samples for confirmation testing. Those confirmed as having taken doping agents stand to lose records and medals from the 2008 games to 2016 under IOC and WADA rules.

On 18 June 2016, the IWF reported that as a consequence of the IOC's reanalyses of samples from the 2008 Olympic Games, the samples of the following seven weightlifters had returned positive results: Hripsime Khurshudyan (Armenia), Intigam Zairov (Azerbaijan), Alexandru Dudoglo (Moldova), gold medalist Ilya Ilyin (Kazakhstan), bronze medalist Nadezda Evstyukhina and silver medalist Marina Shainova (both from Russia), and Nurcan Taylan (Turkey). In line with the relevant rules and regulations, the IWF imposed mandatory provisional suspensions upon the athletes.  Zairov and Ilyin had been serving previous suspensions. In November 2016, Ilyin was stripped of the gold medal.

On 22 July 2016, Sibel Özkan (TUR) was disqualified due to an anti-doping rule violation and stripped of her silver medal. Medals have not been reallocated as yet.

On 28 July 2016, it was announced that retests of samples from the 2008 Summer Olympics detected a positive sample for performance-enhancing drugs from Aksana Miankova of Belarus, who won a gold medal in the women's hammer throw. There have been no decisions about stripping and reallocation of medals as yet.

On 16 August 2016, the Russian women's 4 × 100 metres relay team was disqualified for doping. Russian teammates were stripped of their gold Olympic medals, as Yuliya Chermoshanskaya had her samples reanalyzed and tested positive for two prohibited substances. The IAAF was requested to modify the results accordingly and to consider any further action within its own competence.

On 19 August 2016, the Russian women's 4 × 400 metres relay team was disqualified for doping. Russian teammates were stripped of their silver Olympic medals, as Anastasiya Kapachinskaya had her samples reanalyzed and tested positive for the same two prohibited substances as Chermoshanskaya.

On 24 August 2016, the IWF reported that as a consequence of the IOC's reanalyses of samples from the 2008 Olympic Games, the samples of the following athletes had returned positive results: Nizami Pashayev (Azerbaijan), Iryna Kulesha, Nastassia Novikava, Andrei Rybakou (all from Belarus), Cao Lei, Chen Xiexia, Liu Chunhong (all from China), Mariya Grabovetskaya, Maya Maneza, Irina Nekrassova, Vladimir Sedov (all from Kazakhstan), Khadzhimurat Akkaev, Dmitry Lapikov (both from Russia), and Natalya Davydova and Olha Korobka (both from Ukraine). In line with the relevant rules and regulations, the IWF imposed mandatory provisional suspensions upon the athletes, who remain provisionally suspended in view of potential anti-doping rule violations until their cases are closed.

On 29 August 2016, some non-official reports indicated that Artur Taymazov of Uzbekistan had been stripped of the 2008 Olympic gold medal in the freestyle wrestling 120 kg event due to a positive test for doping.

On 31 August 2016, the IOC disqualified six sportspeople for failing doping tests at the 2008 Games. They included three Russian medalists: weightlifters Nadezhda Evstyukhina (bronze medal in the women's 75 kg event), Marina Shainova (silver medal in the women's 58 kg event), and Tatyana Firova, who finished second with teammates in the 4 × 400 m relay. Bronze medal weightlifter Tigran Martirosyan of Armenia (men's 69 kg event) and fellow weightlifters Alexandru Dudoglo (9th place) of Moldova and Intigam Zairov (9th place) of Azerbaijan were also disqualified.

On 1 September 2016, the IOC disqualified a further two athletes. Cuban discus thrower Yarelys Barrios, who won a silver medal in the women's discus, was disqualified after testing positive for Acetazolamide and ordered to return her medal. Qatari sprinter Samuel Francis, who finished 16th in the 100 meters, was also disqualified after testing positive for Stanozolol.

On 13 September 2016, four more Russian athletes were disqualified for doping offenses. Two of those were medalists from the 2008 Summer Olympics: silver medalist Mariya Abakumova in the women's javelin throw and Denis Alekseyev, who was part of the bronze medal team in the men's 4 × 400 m relay. Inga Abitova, who finished 6th in the 10,000 meters, and cyclist Ekaterina Gnidenko also tested positive for a banned substance and were disqualified.

On 23 September 2016, some non-official reports indicate wrestler Vasyl Fedoryshyn of Ukraine has been stripped of the 2008 Olympic silver medal in the freestyle 60 kg event due to a positive test for doping.

On 6 October 2016, the IOC disqualified Anna Chicherova of the Russian Federation for testing positive for performance-enhancing drugs. She won a bronze medal in the women's high jump. Russia would likely keep the bronze medal, as the fourth-place athlete in the competition was also from Russia.  Through 6 October 2016, the IOC has reported Adverse Analytical Findings for 25 weightlifters from its 2016 retests of samples from the 2008 Beijing Olympic Games, all but three of whom tested positive for anabolic agents (three Chinese weightlifters were positive for growth hormones).

On 26 October 2016, the IOC disqualified nine more athletes for failing drugs tests at the 2008 Games. Among them were six medal winners: weightlifters Andrei Rybakou and Nastassia Novikava, both from Belarus, and Olha Korobka of Ukraine; women's steeplechase bronze medalist Ekaterina Volkova of Russia; and freestyle wrestlers Soslan Tigiev of Uzbekistan and Taimuraz Tigiyev of Kazakhstan. The others were men's 62 kg weightlifter Sardar Hasanov of Azerbaijan, long jumper Wilfredo Martinez of Cuba, and 100m-hurdler Josephine Nnkiruka Onyia of Spain.

On 17 November 2016, the IOC disqualified 16 more athletes for failing drugs tests at the 2008 games. Among them were 10 medal winners: weightlifters Khadzhimurat Akkaev and Dmitry Lapikov and wrestler Khasan Baroev from the Russian Federation, weightlifters Mariya Grabovetskaya, Irina Nekrassova and wrestler Asset Mambetov from Kazakhstan, weightlifter Nataliya Davydova and pole vaulter Denys Yurchenko from Ukraine, long/triple jumper Hrysopiyí Devetzí of Greece and wrestler Vitaliy Rahimov of Azerbaijan. The others were women's 75 kg weightlifter Iryna Kulesha of Belarus, women's +63 kg weightlifter Maya Maneza of Kazakhstan, women's high jumper Vita Palamar of Ukraine, men's 94 kg weightlifter Nizami Pashayev of Azerbaijan, men's 85 kg weightlifter Vladimir Sedov of Kazakhstan, and women's high jumper Elena Slesarenko of the Russian Federation.

On 25 November 2016, the IOC disqualified 5 more athletes for failing drugs tests at the 2008 games. Among them were 3 medal winners: gold-medalists 94 kg weightlifter Ilya Ilin of Kazakhstan and hammer thrower Aksana Miankova of Belarus and silver-medalist shot putter Natallia Mikhnevich of Belarus. The others were shot putter Pavel Lyzhyn and 800m runner Sviatlana Usovich, both of Belarus.

On 12 January 2017, the IOC disqualified five more athletes for failing drug tests at the 2008 Games.  These included three Chinese women's weightlifting gold medalists: Lei Cao (75 kg), Xiexia Chen (48 kg) and Chunhong Liu (69 kg). Two women athletes from Belarus were disqualified: bronze medalist shot putter Nadzeya Ostapchuk and hammer thrower Darya Pchelnik, who did not medal.

On 25 January 2017, the IOC stripped Jamaica of the athletics gold medal in the men's 4 × 100 m relay due to Nesta Carter testing positive for the prohibited substance methylhexaneamine. The IOC also stripped Russian jumper Tatyana Lebedeva of two silver medals in women's triple jump and long jump due to use of turinabol.

On 1 March 2017, the IOC disqualified Victoria Tereshchuk of Ukraine due to use of turinabol and stripped her of the bronze medal in modern pentathlon.

By April 2017, the 2008 Summer Olympics has had the most (50) Olympic medals stripped for doping violations. Russia is the leading country with 14 medals stripped.

Disqualified

Did not start
Athletes who were selected for the Games, but provisionally suspended before competing.

2012 London

It was announced prior to the Summer games that half of all competitors would be tested for drugs, with 150 scientists set to take 6,000 samples between the start of the games and the end of the Paralympic games at GlaxoSmithKline's New Frontiers Science Park site in Harlow, Essex. All medalists would also be tested. The Olympic anti-doping laboratory would test up to 400 samples every day for more than 240 prohibited substances.

The head of the World Anti-Doping Agency (WADA), John Fahey, announced on 24 July that 107 athletes had been sanctioned for doping offences in the six months to 19 June. The "In-competition" period began on 16 July. During the "In-competition" period Olympic competitors can be tested at any time without notice or in advance.

British sprinter Dwain Chambers, cyclist David Millar and shot putter Carl Myerscough competed in London after the British Olympic Association's policy of punishing drug cheats with lifetime bans was overturned by the Court of Arbitration for Sport.

Russian Darya Pishchalnikova participated in the 2012 Olympics and was awarded a silver medal. However, she tested positive for the anabolic steroid oxandrolone in the samples taken in May 2012. In December 2012, she sent an email to WADA containing details on an alleged state-run doping program in Russia. According to The New York Times, the email reached three top WADA officials but the agency decided not to open an inquiry and instead sent her email to Russian sports officials. In April 2013 Pishchalnikova was banned by the Russian Athletics Federation for ten years, and her results from May 2012 were annulled, meaning she was set on track to lose her Olympic medal. Her ban by the Russian Athletics Federation was likely in retaliation.

Gold medalists at the games who had been involved in previous doping offences included Alexander Vinokourov, the winner of the men's road race, Tatyana Lysenko, the winner of the women's hammer throw, Aslı Çakır Alptekin winner of the women's 1500 meters and Sandra Perković, winner of the women's discus throw. Other competitors at the Summer games involved in previous doping cases included American athletes Justin Gatlin and LaShawn Merritt, and Jamaican sprinter Yohan Blake.

Spanish athlete Ángel Mullera was first selected for the 3000 m steeplechase and later removed when emails were published in which he discussed EPO use with a trainer. Mullera appealed to CAS which ordered the Spanish Olympic Committee to allow him to participate.

Prior to the Olympic competition, several prominent track and field athletes were ruled out of the competition due to failed tests. World indoor medallists Dimitrios Chondrokoukis, Debbie Dunn, and Mariem Alaoui Selsouli were withdrawn from their Olympic teams in July for doping, as was 2004 Olympic medallist Zoltán Kővágó. At the Olympic competition, Tameka Williams admitted to taking a banned stimulant and was removed from the games. Ivan Tsikhan did not compete in the hammer throw as a retest of his sample from the 2004 Athens Olympics, where he won silver, was positive. Amine Laâlou, Marina Marghieva, Diego Palomeque, and defending 50 km walk champion Alex Schwazer were also suspended before taking part in their events.

Syrian hurdler Ghfran Almouhamad became the first track-and-field athlete to be suspended following a positive in-competition doping sample. Nadzeya Astapchuk was stripped of the women's shot put title after her sample came back positive for the banned anabolic agent metenolone. Karin Melis Mey was withdrawn before the long jump final when an earlier failed doping test was confirmed.

A WADA report released in 2015 detailed an extensive Russian state-sponsored doping program implicating athletes, coaches, various Russian institutions, doctors and labs. The report stated that the London Olympic Games "were, in a sense, sabotaged by the admission of athletes who should have not been competing" and detailed incidents of bribery and bogus urine samples. The report recommended that Russia be barred from track and field events for the 2016 Olympics. It also recommended lifetime bans for five coaches and five athletes from the country, including runners Mariya Savinova, Ekaterina Poistogova, Anastasiya Bazdyreva, Kristina Ugarova, and Tatjana Myazina.

On 15 June 2016, it was announced that four London 2012 Olympic weightlifting champions had tested positive for performance-enhancing drugs. They include Kazakhstan's Ilya Ilyin (94 kg), Zulfiya Chinshanlo (53 kg), Maiya Maneza (63 kg) and Svetlana Podobedova (75 kg). If confirmed, Kazakhstan would drop from 12th to 23rd in the 2012 medal standings. Six other lifters who competed at the 2012 Games also tested positive after hundreds of samples were reanalysed. Among them are Russia's Apti Aukhadov (silver at 85 kg), Ukraine's Yuliya Kalina (bronze at 58 kg), Belarusian Maryna Shkermankova (bronze at 69 kg), Azerbaijan's Boyanka Kostova and Belarus duo Dzina Sazanavets and Yauheni Zharnasek. On 27 July 2016, IWF has reported in the second wave of re-sampling that three silver medalists from Russia, namely Natalya Zabolotnaya (at 75 kg), Aleksandr Ivanov (at 94 kg) and Svetlana Tsarukaeva (at 63 kg), together with bronze medalists Armenian Hripsime Khurshudyan (at 75+ kg), Belarusian Iryna Kulesha (at 75 kg) and Moldovan Cristina Iovu (at 53 kg) have tested positive for steroid dehydrochlormethyltestosterone. Aukhadov was stripped of his silver medal by the IOC on 18 October 2016. On 27 October 2016 Maiya Maneza was stripped of her gold medal. In November 2016, Ilyin was stripped of the London gold medal.

On 13 July 2016, the IOC announced that Yuliya Kalina of Ukraine had been disqualified from the 2012 Summer Olympics and ordered to return the bronze medal from the 58 kg weightlifting event. Reanalysis of Kalina's samples from London 2012 resulted in a positive test for the prohibited substance dehydrochlormethyltestosterone (turinabol). The positions were adjusted accordingly.

On 9 August 2016, the IOC announced that Oleksandr Pyatnytsya of Ukraine would be stripped of his silver medal in the javelin throw after he tested positive for the prohibited substance dehydrochlormethyltestosterone (turinabol). Redistribution of medals has not yet been announced, but the likely case is the silver and bronze medals will be given to Finland and Czech Republic instead.

On 20 August 2016, the IOC announced that Yevgeniya Kolodko of Russia would be stripped of her silver medal in shot put after she tested positive of dehydrochlormethyltestosterone (turinabol) and ipamorelin. Medals are not reallocated yet.

On 29 August 2016, a report indicated that a retested sample for Besik Kudukhov of Russia, the silver medalist in the men's 60 kg freestyle wrestling event, had returned a positive result (later disclosed as dehydrochlormethyltestosterone). Kudakhov died in a car crash in December 2013. On 27 October 2016, the IOC dropped all disciplinary proceedings against Kudukhov, stating that such proceedings cannot be conducted against a deceased person. As a result, it said, Olympic results that would have been reviewed will remain uncorrected, which is the unavoidable consequence of the fact that the proceedings cannot move forward.

On 13 September 2016, the IWF reported that the men's 94 kg weightlifting bronze medalist, Moldova's Anatolie Cîrîcu, had tested positive for the dehydrochlormethyltestosterone.

On 6 October 2016, the IWF reported that as a consequence of the IOC's reanalyses of samples from the 2012 Olympic Games, a sample of Norayr Vardanyan, who represented Armenia, had returned a positive result. In line with the relevant rules and regulations, the IWF imposed mandatory provisional suspensions upon Vardanyan, who remains provisionally suspended  until his case is closed.  On 12 January 2017, the IOC disqualified Vardanyan. Through 6 October 2016, the IOC had reported Adverse Analytical Findings for 23 weightlifters from its 2016 retests of samples from the 2012 London Olympic Games, all of whom tested positive for anabolic agents.

On 11 October 2016, Tatyana Lysenko of the Russian Federation was disqualified from the women's hammer throw, in which she won the gold medal. She had tested positive for a banned substance. The IOC requested the IAAF to modify the results of this event accordingly. The silver medalist Anita Włodarczyk of Poland would likely take the gold medal in her place.

On 18 October 2016, the IOC disqualified Apti Aukhadov of the Russian Federation for doping and stripped him of the silver medal. The IOC requested the IWF to modify the results of this event accordingly; it has not yet published modified results.

On 18 October 2016, the IOC reported that Maksym Mazuryk of Ukraine, who competed in the Men's Pole Vault event, was disqualified from the 2012 London Games, in which he ranked 18th. Re-analysis of Mazuryk's samples resulted in a positive test for dehydrochlormethyltestosterone.

On 27 October 2016 the IOC disqualified a further eight athletes for failing doping tests at the games. This included four medal winners in weightlifting: Zulfiya Chinshanlo, Maiya Maneza and Svetlana Podobedova, all from Kazakhstan, and Maryna Shkermankova of Belarus.  The others were hammer thrower Kirill Ikonnikov of Russia, women's 69 kg weightlifter Dzina Sazanavets of Belarus, pole vaulter Dmitry Starodubtsev of Russia, and men's +105 kg weightlifter Yauheni Zharnasek of Belarus.

On 21 November 2016 the IOC disqualified a further 12 athletes for failing doping tests at the games. This included 6 medal winners in weightlifting, including Alexandr Ivanov (Russia), Anatoli Ciricu (Moldova), Cristina Iovu (Moldova), Natalya Zabolotnaya (Russia), Iryna Kulesha (Belarus), and Hripsime Khurshudyan (Armenia). Moldova has lost all its 2012 London medals.  The others were hammer thrower Oleksandr Drygol and long jumper Margaryta Tverdokhlib, both of Ukraine, 85 kg weightlifter Rauli Tsirekidze of Georgia, 94 kg weightlifter Almas Uteshov of Kazakhstan, 94 kg weightlifter Andrey Demanov of Russia and 3000m steeplechaser Yuliya Zaripova of Russia, who had previously been sanctioned in March 2016 by the Court of Arbitration for Sport.

On 25 November 2016, the IOC disqualified 4 more athletes for failing drug tests at the 2012 games. They were gold medalist 94 kg weightlifter Ilya Ilin of Kazakhstan, hammer thrower Aksana Miankova and long jumper Nastassia Mironchyk-Ivanova, both of Belarus, and 58 kg weightlifter Boyanka Kostova of Azerbaijan.

On 29 November 2016 the Court of Arbitration for Sport issued a decision that all results achieved by 2012 Olympic heptathlon bronze medalist Tatyana Chernova of Russia between 15 August 2011 and 22 July 2013 are annulled.  It also annulled all of Yekaterina Sharmina's results between 17 June 2011 and 5 August 2015, including her 33rd-place finish in the 2012 women's 1500m. CAS ruled that they "have been found to have committed an anti-doping rule violation ... of the International Athletic Association Federation (IAAF) Competition Rules after analysis of their Athlete Biological Passports (ABP) showed evidence of blood doping."

On 12 January 2017, the IOC disqualified three weightlifters for failing drug tests at the 2012 games. Two competed in men's 94 kg weightlifting: Intigam Zairov of Azerbaijan and Norayr Vardanyan of Armenia. Women's 63 kg weightlifter Sibel Simsek of Turkey was disqualified. None was a medalist at these games.

On 1 February 2017, the IOC disqualified three athletes due to failed doping tests, all of whom tested positive for turinabol. Russian women's discus thrower Vera Ganeeva, who finished 23rd, Turkish boxer Adem Kilicci, who ranked 5th in men's 69–75 kg boxing, and Russian 400m runner Antonina Krivoshapka, who finished 6th, were disqualified. Krivoshapka also was part of the Russian silver medal-winning women's 4 × 400 m relay team, which was stripped of the silver medals.

In December 2014, a documentary aired on German TV in which 800m gold medalist Mariya Savinova allegedly admitted to using banned substances on camera. In November 2015, Savinova was one of five Russian runners the World Anti-Doping Agency recommended to receive a lifetime ban for doping during the London Olympics, along with 800m bronze medalist Ekaterina Poistogova. On 10 February 2017, the Court of Arbitration for Sport upheld a four-year ban that effectively stripped Savinova of her Olympic gold and other medals. On 7 April 2017, CAS refused to decide on disqualification from 2012, and disqualify Ekaterina Poistogova from 2015. Thus, Ekaterina Poistogova retained her Olympic 2012 medal at women's 800 metres athletic event.

As of December 2022, the 2012 Summer Olympics has seen a record 40 Olympic medals stripped for doping violations. Russia is the leading country with 17 medals stripped.

On 21 March 2022, the Athletics Integrity Unit of World Athletics issued a two-year ban for Russian racewalker Elena Lashmanova, starting from 9 March 2021, and also disqualified her results from 18 February 2012, to 3 January 2014, thus stripping her gold medal.

Disqualified

Did not start
Athletes who were selected for the Games, but provisionally suspended before competing.

2016 Rio de Janeiro

Originally, Russia submitted a list of 389 athletes for competition. On 7 August 2016, the IOC cleared 278 athletes, and 111 were removed because of the state-sponsored doping scandal.

The Taiwanese weightlifter Lin Tzu-chi was withdrawn from the games hours before her event by her team's delegation for an abnormal drugs test.

Kenyan athletics coach, John Anzrah who travelled to Rio independently of his country's delegation, was sent home after being caught posing as an athlete during a doping test, and was followed by Kenya's track and field manager, Michael Rotich, who was filmed by a newspaper offering to give athletes advanced notice of any pending drugs test in return for a one-off payment.

On 13 October 2016, the IWF reported that weightlifter Gabriel Sincraian of Romania, who won bronze in the men's 85-kg event, tested positive for excess testosterone in a test connected to the Rio Olympics. On 8 December 2016, the CAS affirmed the disqualification of Sincraian and stripped him of the bronze medal.  The CAS also disqualified silver medalist 52 kg boxer Misha Aloian of Russia after he tested positive for tuaminoheptane.

Disqualified

Did not start
Athletes who were selected for the Games, but provisionally suspended before competing.

2020 Tokyo

Did not start
Athletes who were selected for the Games, but provisionally suspended before competing.

Winter Olympic Games

1968 Grenoble

No athletes were caught doping at these Games.

1972 Sapporo

1976 Innsbruck

1980 Lake Placid

No athletes tested positive at these Games.

1984 Sarajevo

The Finnish cross-country skier Aki Karvonen admitted in 1994 that he'd had blood transfusions for the Sarajevo Games. Blood transfusions weren't formally banned by IOC until 1986. Karvonen won a silver and two bronze at the games.

1988 Calgary

1992 Albertville

No athletes were caught using performance-enhancing drugs at these Games. The Russian biathlete Sergei Tarasov admitted in 2015 that the Russian biathlon team had carried out illegal blood transfusions at the Games. Something went very wrong with his transfusion, and he was rushed to the hospital where they saved his life.

1994 Lillehammer

No athletes were caught using performance-enhancing drugs at these Games.

1998 Nagano

No athletes were caught using performance-enhancing drugs at these Games. The Canadian snowboarder Ross Rebagliati, winner of the men's giant slalom, was initially disqualified and stripped of his gold medal by the International Olympic Committee's executive board after testing positive for marijuana. Marijuana was not then on the list of prohibited substances by the IOC, and their decision was reversed by the Court of Arbitration for Sport and Rebagliati's medal reinstated.

2002 Salt Lake City

2006 Turin

On 25 April 2007, six Austrian athletes were banned for life from the Olympics for their involvement in a doping scandal at the 2006 Turin Olympics, the first time the IOC punished athletes without a positive or missed doping test. The Austrians were found guilty of possessing doping substances and taking part in a conspiracy, based on materials seized by Italian police during a raid on the athletes' living quarters. The Austrians also had their competition results from Turin annulled. A seventh athlete, cross-country skier Christian Hoffmann, had his case referred to the International Ski Federation for further investigation, but IOC charges were dismissed.

The IOC has retested nearly 500 doping samples that were collected at the 2006 Turin Games. In 2014, the Estonian Olympic Committee was notified by the IOC that a retested sample from cross-country skier Kristina Šmigun had tested positive. On 24 October 2016, the World Anti-Doping Agency Athletes' Commission stated that Šmigun, who won two gold medals at the Turin Games, faces a Court of Arbitration for Sport hearing before the end of October. If Šmigun were to be stripped of her gold medals, Kateřina Neumannová of Czech Republic could be elevated to gold in the 7.5 + 7.5 km double pursuit event. Marit Bjørgen of Norway could acquire a seventh gold medal in the 10 km classical event.
The case against Šmigun was dropped on 13 December 2017 without any charges being raised.

Did not start
On 13 February 2006, the Brazilian Olympic Committee announced that Armando dos Santos' preventive antidoping test, which had been done in Brazil on 4 January 2006, was positive for the forbidden substance nandrolone. Santos was ejected from the team, being replaced by former sprinter Claudinei Quirino, the team's substitute athlete.

Disqualified during the Games

Disqualified after the Games

2010 Vancouver

On 23 December 2016, the IOC stated that it will re-analyse all samples from Russian athletes at the Olympic Winter Games of Vancouver 2010.  In October 2017, the IOC stated that one sole athlete was caught from retests of doping samples from the Vancouver 2010 Winter Olympic Games. Biathlete Teja Gregorin was confirmed as this athlete by the International Biathlon Union.  A total of 1195 samples from Vancouver 2010 (70% of the 1700 available) were reanalyzed. This included all medalists and all of the 170 Russian athletes.  The IOC requested all Russian samples from the 2010 Games be retested after the publication of the McLaren Report. Russia's disappointing performance at Vancouver (11th in gold medal table with a total of 3 golds) is cited as the reason behind the implementation of a doping scheme alleged to have been in operation at major events such as the 2014 Games at Sochi.

Did not start

Disqualified after the Games

2014 Sochi

According to the director of the country's antidoping laboratory at the time, Grigory Rodchenkov, dozens of Russian athletes at the 2014 Winter Olympics in Sochi, including at least 15 medal winners, were part of a state-run doping program, meticulously planned for years to ensure dominance at the Games.

In December 2016, following the release of the McLaren report on Russian doping at the Sochi Olympics, the International Olympic Committee announced the initiation of an investigation of 28 Russian athletes (the number later rose to 46) at the Sochi Olympic Games. La Gazzetta dello Sport reported the names of 17 athletes, of whom 15 are among the 28 under investigation.

Three female figure skaters were named as being under investigation. They are Adelina Sotnikova, the singles gold medalist, as well as pairs skaters Tatiana Volosozhar and Ksenia Stolbova. Volosozhar and Stolbova won gold and silver medals, respectively, in pairs skating. Both also won gold medals in the team event, which also puts the other eight team medalists at risk of losing their golds.  In November 2017 the proceeding against Sotnikova was dropped.

Six cross-country skiers were suspended from competition on the basis of the McLaren Report: Evgeniy Belov, Alexander Legkov, Alexey Petukhov, Maxim Vylegzhanin, Yulia Ivanova and Evgenia Shapovalova. Legkov won a gold and silver medals, and Vylegzhanin won three silver medals.  The IOC disqualified all six from Sochi, imposed lifetime bans and, in the process, stripped Legkov and Vylegzhanin of the medals they had won in four events (three individual medals and one team medal). Nikita Kryukov, Alexander Bessmertnykh and Natalya Matveyeva were also disqualified on 22 December 2017.

The International Biathlon Union suspended two Russian biathletes who were in the Sochi games: Olga Vilukhina and Yana Romanova. Vilukhina won silver in sprint, and both women were on a relay team that won the silver medal. They were disqualified and stripped of their medals on 27 November 2017.

The International Bobsleigh and Skeleton Federation suspended four Russian skeleton sliders. They were  Alexander Tretyakov, Elena Nikitina, Maria Orlova and Olga Potylitsina. Tretyakov won a gold medal, and Nikitina won a bronze.  On 22 November 2017, the IOC stripped these medals and imposed lifetime Olympic bans on all four. Skeleton racer Sergei Chudinov was sanctioned on 28 November 2017.

Seven Russian female ice hockey players were to have hearings before the Oswald Commission on 22 November 2017. Two of the seven were accused of submitting samples showing readings that were physically impossible to be held by a woman. The Russian women's ice hockey team finished sixth at Sochi 2014. On 12 December 2017, six of them were disqualified. Tatiana Burina and Anna Shukina were also disqualified ten days later.

On 24 November 2017, the IOC imposed life bans on bobsledder Alexandr Zubkov and speed skater Olga Fatkulina who won a combined 3 medals (2 gold, 1 silver). All their results were disqualified, meaning that Russia lost its first place in the medal standings. Bobsledders Aleksei Negodaylo and Dmitry Trunenkov were disqualified 3 days later. 3 other Russian athletes who didn't win medals were banned on 29 November 2017. Biathlete Olga Zaitseva and 2 other Russian athletes were banned on 1 December 2017. Bobsledder Alexey Voyevoda who had been already stripped of his gold medals due to the anti-doping violations committed by his teammates was sanctioned on 18 December 2017. Speed skaters Ivan Skobrev and Artyom Kuznetsov, lugers Albert Demchenko and Tatiana Ivanova, and bobsledders Liudmila Udobkina and Maxim Belugin were disqualified on 22 December 2017, bringing the total to 43. Demchenko and Ivanova were also stripped of their silver medals.

2018 Pyeongchang

After the Russian Olympic Committee was barred from competing at the 2018 Winter Olympics, Russian athletes deemed to be clean were allowed to compete as Olympic Athletes from Russia.

2022 Beijing
By the end of the Beijing Olympics, a total five athletes were reported for doping violations.

Controversy surrounding the ROC
The medal ceremony for the team event in figure skating, where the ROC won gold, originally scheduled for 8 February, was delayed over what International Olympic Committee (IOC) spokesperson Mark Adams described as a situation that required "legal consultation" with the International Skating Union. Several media outlets reported on 9 February that the issue was over a positive test for trimetazidine by the ROC's Kamila Valieva, which was officially confirmed on 11 February. Valieva's sample in question was taken by the Russian Anti-Doping Agency (RUSADA) at the 2022 Russian Figure Skating Championships on 25 December, but the sample was not analyzed at the World Anti-Doping Agency (WADA) laboratory where it was sent for testing until 8 February, one day after the team event concluded.

Valieva was assessed a provisional suspension after her positive result, but upon appeal, she was cleared by RUSADA's independent Disciplinary Anti-Doping Committee (DAC) on 9 February, just a day after receiving the provisional suspension. Following formal appeals lodged by the IOC, the International Skating Union (ISU), and WADA to review RUSADA DAC's decision, the Court of Arbitration for Sport (CAS) heard the case on 13 February, and removal of her provisional suspension was upheld on 14 February, ahead of her scheduled appearance in the women's singles event beginning 15 February. Due to Valieva being a minor at the time, as well as being classified as a "protected person" under WADA guidelines, RUSADA and the IOC announced on 12 February that they would broaden the scope of their respective investigations to include members of her entourage (e.g. coaches, team doctors, etc.).

On 14 February, the CAS declined to reinstate Valieva's provisional suspension issued the previous Monday and ruled that she would be allowed provisionally to compete in the women's singles event. The CAS decided that preventing her from competing "would cause her irreparable harm in the circumstances", while noting that any medals won by Valieva at the Beijing Olympics would be withheld pending the results of the continuing investigation into her doping violation. The temporary provisional decision from the court was made on three grounds: 1/ Due to her age, she is a "Protected Person" as per WADA Code, subject to different rules than adult athletes; 2/ Athlete "did not test positive during the Olympic Games in Beijing; 3/ "There were serious issues of untimely notification of the results, ... which impinged upon the Athlete’s ability to establish certain legal requirements for her benefit". The IOC announced that the team event medal ceremony, as well as the women's singles flower ceremony and medal ceremony if Valieva were to medal, would not take place until the investigation is over, and there is a concrete decision whether to strip Valieva and the ROC of their medals. To allow for the possibility that Valieva's results may be disqualified, the IOC asked the ISU to expand the qualifying field for the women's singles free skating by one to 25.

Did not start
Athletes who were selected for the Games, but provisionally suspended before competing.

See also
Doping at the Asian Games
List of sporting scandals
List of stripped Olympic medals
List of doping cases in sport
World Anti-Doping Agency
Technology doping

References

External links
 Olympic Movement Anti-doping Code
 
 

Olympic Games controversies

Lists of sportspeople
Olympic Games

Olympics-related lists
Doping in Russia